Anastasia Pavlyuchenkova was the defending champion and successfully defended her title, defeating Madison Brengle in the final, 7–6(8–6), 7–6(7–3).

Seeds

Draw

Finals

Top half

Section 1

Section 2

Bottom half

Section 3

Section 4

References

External links 
 Main draw

Girls' Singles
Australian Open, 2007 Girls' Singles